Elk v. Wilkins, 112 U.S. 94 (1884), was a United States Supreme Court landmark 1884 decision respecting the citizenship status of Indians.

John Elk, a Winnebago Indian, was born on an Indian reservation within the territorial bounds of United States. He later resided off-reservation in Omaha, Nebraska, where he renounced his former tribal allegiance and claimed birthright citizenship by virtue of the Citizenship Clause of the Fourteenth Amendment. The case came about after Elk tried to register to vote on April 5, 1880 and was denied by Charles Wilkins, the named defendant, who was registrar of voters of the Fifth ward of the City of Omaha.

In a 7–2 decision, the Supreme Court ruled that even though Elk was born in the United States, he was not a citizen because he owed allegiance to his tribe when he was born rather than to the United States, and therefore was not subject to the jurisdiction of the United States when he was born. The United States Congress later enacted the Indian Citizenship Act of 1924, which established citizenship for Indians previously excluded by the Constitution. Though rendered undebatable for its application to native Indians by this law, the majority opinion offered by the Court in this case remains valid for interpretation of future citizenship issues regarding the 14th Amendment.

Background
The question then was whether an Indian born a member of one of the Indian tribes within the United States is, merely by reason of their birth within the United States and of their afterward voluntarily separating themself from the tribe and taking up residence among white citizens, a citizen of the United States within the meaning of the first section of the Fourteenth Amendment of the Constitution.

Under the Constitution, Congress had and exercised the power to regulate commerce with the Indian tribes, and the members thereof, within or without the boundaries of one of the states of the Union. The "Indian tribes, being within the territorial limits of the United States, were not, strictly speaking, foreign states"; but "they were alien nations, distinct political communities", with whom the United States  dealt with through treaties and acts of Congress. The members of those tribes owed immediate allegiance to their several tribes, and were not part of the people of the United States.

Decision
Even though Elk was born within the territorial jurisdiction of the United States, he was born as a subject of an Indian nation, and thus could not meet the allegiance test of the jurisdictional phrase because he "owed immediate allegiance to" his tribe, a vassal or quasi-nation, not to the United States. The Court held Elk was not "subject to the jurisdiction" of the United States at birth.   "The evident meaning of these last words is, not merely subject in some respect or degree to the jurisdiction of the United States, but completely subject to their political jurisdiction, and owing them direct and immediate allegiance."

Subsequent legislation
The exclusion of Native Americans from citizenship was eventually eliminated by the Indian Citizenship Act of 1924. At the time, two thirds of Native Americans had already achieved citizenship.

See also
List of United States Supreme Court cases, volume 112
Standing Bear v. Crook
United States nationality law

References

Further reading

External links

 

United States Supreme Court cases
1884 in United States case law
United States Citizenship Clause case law
United States Native American case law
History of Omaha, Nebraska
History of voting rights in the United States
Ho-Chunk
United States Supreme Court cases of the Waite Court
1880 Nebraska elections
Race and law in the United States
Native American history of Nebraska